Minuscule 794 (in the Gregory-Aland numbering), δ454 (von Soden), is a Greek minuscule manuscript of the New Testament written on paper. Palaeographically it has been assigned to the 14th century. The manuscript has no complex contents.

Description 
The codex contains the text of the four Gospels, Book of Acts, Catholic epistles, and Pauline epistles on 269 paper leaves (size ), with some lacunae. The later hand supplied texts of Matthew 1:1-9:19; 1 Timothy 5:4-Philemon. It lacks Romans 1:1-7.17-23.

The text is written in one column per page, 32 lines per page.

There is also another division according to the smaller Ammonian Sections (ends on 67 in Mark). There is no references to the Eusebian Canons.

Text 
The Greek text of the codex is a representative of the Byzantine text-type. Hermann von Soden classified it to the textual family Kx. Aland placed it in Category V.

According to the Claremont Profile Method it represents mixed Byzantine text in Luke 1 and Luke 20. In Luke 10 no profile was made. It belongs to the textual cluster 183.

The text of Matthew 16:2b-3 was added by the first hand on the margin. The text of the Pericope Adulterae (John 7:53-8:11) was added by a later hand.

The text of Hebrews was copied twice, once by the original hand, and a second time by the later scribe who had taken over the copying at 2 Timothy. Not realizing the first scribe had already copied Hebrews, the second scribe copied it again.

History 
According to Gregory the manuscript was written in the 14th century. The manuscript is currently dated by the INTF to the 14th century. The name of scribe was Paul.

The manuscript was noticed in catalogue from 1876.

It was added to the list of New Testament manuscripts by Gregory (794). Gregory saw the manuscript in 1886.

The manuscript is now housed at the National Library of Greece (122) in Athens.

See also 

 List of New Testament minuscules
 Biblical manuscript
 Textual criticism
 Minuscule 793

References

Further reading 

 

Greek New Testament minuscules
14th-century biblical manuscripts
Manuscripts of the National Library of Greece